The Chestnut Ridge people (CRP) are a mixed-race community concentrated in an area northeast of Philippi, Barbour County in north-central West Virginia, with smaller related communities in the adjacent counties of Harrison and Taylor. They are often referred to as "Mayles" (from the most common surname — Mayle or Male), or "Guineas" (now considered a pejorative term).

The group has been the subject of county histories and some scholarly studies. Some scholars have classified this group as a tri-racial isolate. Contemporary census records frequently designate community members as "mulattos", implying African heritage. Thomas McElwain wrote that many CRP identified as an Indian-white mixed group, or as Native American, but they are not enrolled in any officially recognized tribe. Paul Heinegg documented that many individuals were classified as free people of color, or similar terms in a variety of colonial, local and state records.

Some CRP have identified as Melungeon, a mixed-race group based in Kentucky and Tennessee, and attended the Melungeon unions, or joined the Melungeon Heritage Association. In 1997 two local historians made a presentation about the "Guineas of West Virginia" at the University of Virginia's College at Wise.

History
Barbour County was settled primarily by white people from eastern Virginia, beginning in the 1770s and '80s. It was part of the colony (later state) of Virginia until West Virginia was admitted to the Union as a separate state during the American Civil War. The mixed-race families that later became known as "Chestnut Ridge people" began to arrive after 1810, when Barbour was still part of Randolph and Harrison Counties, according to census records. 

By the 1860s, many individuals of these mixed-race families had married into the white community, and their descendants identified as white. Some of the men served in West Virginia Union army regiments during the Civil War. Records in the Barbour County Courthouse indicate that a dozen men successfully petitioned the courts to be declared legally white after serving in the war for the Union.

The local West Virginia historian Hu Maxwell was bemused by the origin of these people when he studied Barbour County history in the late 1890s:

There is a clan of colored people in Barbour County often called "Guineas", under the erroneous presumption that they are Guinea negroes.  They vary in color from white to black, often have blue eyes and straight hair, and they are generally industrious. Their number in Barbour is estimated at one thousand.  They have been a puzzle to the investigator; for their origin is not generally known. They are among the earliest settlers of Barbour. Prof. W.W. Male of Grafton, West Virginia, belongs to this clan, and after a thorough investigation, says "They originated from an Englishman named Male who came to America at the outbreak of the Revolution. From that one man have sprung about 700 of the same name, not to speak of the half-breeds." Thus it would seem that the family was only half-black at the beginning, and by the inter-mixtures since, many are now almost white.

The people of "The Ridge" have traditionally been subject to severe racial discrimination, amounting to ostracism, by the surrounding majority-white community. In the 1930s, a local historian recorded that "on several occasions suits have been entered in Taylor and Barbour courts seeking to prevent these people from sending their children to schools with whites but proof of claims they have negro blood in their veins never has been established". As recently as the late 1950s, a few Philippi businesses still posted notices proclaiming "White Trade Only", directed against the CRP, as they were believed to be part African-American. Although the local public schools were not segregated, truancy laws — which were strictly enforced for white children — were typically neglected with regard to "Ridge people".

Demographics
If related individuals in the surrounding counties of Harrison and Taylor are included, the CRP probably now number about 1,500, almost all of whom bear one of fewer than a dozen surnames. The Taylor County group (also long referred to by their neighbors as "Guineas" and mostly dispersed in the 1930s due to the flooding of their community — known as the "West Hill settlement" — by Tygart Lake) bore the surnames of Mayle, Male, Mahalie, Croston, Dalton, Kennedy, Johnson and Parsons, among others. A 1977 survey of obituaries in The Barbour Democrat showed that 135 of 163 "Ridge people" (83%) living in Barbour County were married to people having the last names Mayle, Norris, Croston, Prichard, Collins, Adams, or Kennedy.  In 1984, of the 67 Mayles who had listed telephones, all but three lived on "The Ridge."

Ancestry
Genealogist Paul Heinegg has used a variety of colonial era documents to trace the ancestors of families identified in the South as free blacks in the first two censuses of the United States (1790, 1800). These included court records, indentures, land deeds, wills, etc. For instance, if a white woman had an illegitimate mixed-race child, the child had to serve a period of apprenticeship as an indentured servant to be trained in a trade and to prevent the community from having to support the woman and her child. Records of such indentures are among the court records he consulted.

He found that most of the families of free people of color were descended from unions between white women, free or indentured servants, and African or African-American men, slaves or indentured servants, in colonial Virginia. According to the law of the colony and the principle of partus sequitur ventrem, by which children in the colony took the status of their mothers, the mixed-race children of these unions and marriages were born free because the mothers were free. While they were subject to discrimination, gaining free status helped these families get ahead in society.

Heinegg noted that many of these free people of color migrated west with white neighbors and settled on the frontiers of Virginia, what became West Virginia, Kentucky and Tennessee, as these areas were less bound by racial caste than were the Tidewater plantation areas. On the frontier, settlers were more concerned about people fulfilling social obligations as citizens. 

Heinegg's work was praised by an expert in Southern history, and won a genealogy award.

Heinegg analyzed generations of many families classified as free blacks on those first two censuses. He noted that, for the early Mayle/Male family, many records from the 1790s to the 1850s classified members as "free black", "free mulatto", "free colored", etc.

He suggests that the following individuals are sons of Wilmore Mayle (Mail, Male), Sr. (Note that, prior to 1843, the area of Barbour County west of the Tygart Valley River was part of Harrison County and the area east of the river was part of Randolph County.)

Wilmore Male Jr.
1797 - described as "a free black" in tax list of Hampshire County, Virginia
1810 - head of household that included 8 "other free" persons in Hampshire County, Virginia
1810-1 - taxable for 2 "F[ree]M[ulattos]" in tax lists of Hampshire County, Virginia
1812 - taxed as "F[ree]M[ulatto]" in tax list of Hampshire County, Virginia
1813 - taxed as "of color" in tax list of Monongalia County, Virginia
1815 - described as "F[ree]N[egro]" in tax list of Monongalia County, Virginia
1817 - described as "Col[ore]d" in tax list of Randolph County, Virginia
1820 - head of household that included 8 "free colored" persons in Randolph County, Virginia
1830 - head of household that included 2 "free colored" persons in Hampshire County, Virginia
1840 - head of household that included 2 "free colored" persons in Hampshire County, Virginia

William Male
1803 - described as a "free Mulatto" in tax list of Hampshire County, Virginia
1810 - head of household that included 12 "other free" persons in Monongalia County, Virginia
1813-29 - described as "Mul[att]o" or "Col[ore]d" in tax lists of Randolph County, Virginia
1820 - head of household that included 7 "free colored" persons in Randolph County, Virginia
1840 - head of household that included 2 "free colored" persons in Randolph County, Virginia

James Male
1810 - head of household that included 6 "other free" persons in Monongalia County, Virginia
1813 - described as "man of colour" in tax list of Harrison County, Virginia
1816-1818 - described as "col[ore]d" in tax lists of Randolph County, Virginia
1830 - head of household that included 9 "free colored" persons in Frederick County, Virginia

George Male
1812-1817 - described as "man of colour" in tax lists of Harrison County, Virginia
1820 - head of household that included 6 "free colored" persons in Randolph County, Virginia
1822-1829 - tax lists of "Free negroes & Mulattoes" in Randolph County, Virginia
1830 - head of household that included 6 "free colored" persons in Randolph County, Virginia
1840 - head of household that included 7 "free colored" persons in Randolph County, Virginia

Richard Male
1813-29 - described as "Mul[att]o" or "Col[ore]d" in tax lists of Randolph County, Virginia
1820 - head of household that included 7 "free colored" persons in Randolph County, Virginia
1830 - head of household that included 3 "free colored" persons in Randolph County, Virginia
1840 - head of household that included 4 "free colored" persons in Randolph County, Virginia
1850 - widow Rhoda described as a "Mulatto" in census of Barbour County, Virginia

Work by Alexandra Finley has confirmed that the CRP descend in the direct paternal line from an immigrant Englishman, Wilmore Mail (1755-ca. 1845), born in Dover, Kent, England.

Mail settled in Virginia with his parents William and Mary in the 1760s. As an adult, Mail purchased a black female slave named Nancy. In 1826, when he was 71, Mail both emancipated and claimed her as a common-law wife; interracial marriage was illegal in Virginia. The emancipation document reads as follows:

 
Over the following two decades, Mail was classified as "white", "colored" and "mulatto" in official documents. The Federal Census of 1840 classified him as "free colored".

(In 2014, Harvard historian Henry Louis Gates, Jr discovered, through DNA genealogy testing, that Wilmore Mail is among his ancestors. Although no documentary connection was made, Mail is the only one of Gates' white ancestors for whom a name is known. This discovery was featured on the final second-season episode of Professor Gates' television series Finding Your Roots with Henry Louis Gates, Jr.. He visited Philippi and attended a "Heritage Day" gathering on Chestnut Ridge.)

In addition to the Mail family, Finley's work also identified a number of other CRP families that can trace their heritage back to Revolutionary War-era mixed-race forebears, notably Sam Norris (1750-1844), Gustavus D. Croston (1757-ca. 1845) and Henry Dalton (1750-1836), as well as others arriving in the mid-19th century, such as Jacob Minerd (1816-1907). The descendants of each of these progenitors fostered their own local "race" complete with unique folklore and origin story.

Dissenting views

Dissenting view #1: No black heritage
B.V. Mayhle self-published a family history entitled The Males of Barbour County, West Virginia in 1980, with two updates.  He documented the origins of the Male, Mahle, Mayle, Mayhle name in the United States. He claimed to have found only one incident of interracial union.

In an interview, he pointed out that the Pittsburgh, Pennsylvania press had carried repeated sensational magazine articles in the early 1900s about the area, highlighting its poverty and mixed-race communities. He suggests this was the origin of accounts that the group was mixed-race. (Note: The account above predates such articles.) The photographs of Male descendants that are included in his book, many from this same time period, do not show physical characteristics associated with African phenotypes. (But, other photographs of self-identified Chestnut Ridge people now available on the Internet do show some with such phenotypes.)

Mayhle said that three brothers, direct descendants of Wilmore/William Male (the original Male immigrant), served in regular white units in the US Civil war.  Two served in the 7th West Virginia Infantry and one in the 1st West Virginia Cavalry, all white units. (Note Heinegg's discussion above, that documents court records of twelve soldiers, including several of the Male/Mayle surname, petitioning to be declared legally white in 1861 and 1866.)

Dissenting view #2: Native American heritage
"What Ms. Finley fails to state is, that Wilmore Mail is the son of Wilmore Sr. who died 1800. Wilmore Jr. married Priscilla "Nancy" Harris, a "Catawba." 	

Notes for Priscilla (Nancy) Harris: It has been told that Priscilla was a pretty little daughter of a slave girl and a Cherokee Indian. Her mother was supposed to have been a slave girl brought to this country in the middle 1700s by a Frenchman from the Bahamas by the name of Marquis Calmes. It is not known whether she was of native Bahamian Indian ancestry or not. She eloped with a Cherokee Indian by the name of Harris and to these two Priscilla was born.
French and Spanish settlers in America intermarried freely with the Indians, but the English seldom mixed with the natives. Hence it appears that among the pioneer families of our County, the Mayle, Mail or Male family have Indian blood in their veins.

In 1936 a Maryland local paper reported on Garrett County family history. It said that, according to family tradition, Marquis Calmes, a Frenchman residing in Virginia, had a French servant woman. It was not known whether she was from France or the French colony on Haiti. She was said to fall in love with a Cherokee man, and they had a daughter known as Priscilla Harris. Priscilla grew up on the Calmes plantation, and was said to be beautiful, with an olive complexion, black eyes, and long hair -- "so long that she could sit on it." Her descendants were said to have kept some of Priscilla's wonderful hair for many years.

See also
Scott Mayle

References

Further reading
Burnell, Jr, John F. (1952), "The Guineas of West Virginia" (unpublished M.A. thesis), Ohio State University.
Gilbert, Jr., William Harlen. (1946), "Mixed Bloods of the Upper Monongahela Valley, West Virginia"; Journal of the Washington Academy of the Sciences, Vol. 36, no. 1 (Jan. 15, 1946), pp 1–13.
 Gilbert, Jr., William Harlen. (1946), "Memorandum Concerning the Characteristics of the Larger Mixed-Blood Racial Islands of the Eastern United States", Social Forces 21/4 (May 1946), pp 438–477.
"Barbour County Home Of 'Guinea' Colony," Beckley Post Herald, 27 May 1965.
Smith, Joanne Johnson, Florence Kennedy Barnett, and Lois Kennedy Croston, "We The People Of Chestnut Ridge: A Native Community in Barbour County", Goldenseal, Fall 1999, published by West Virginia Division of Culture and History.

Multiracial ethnic groups in the United States
African–Native American relations
Society of Appalachia
Ethnic groups in West Virginia
African-American history of West Virginia
People from Barbour County, West Virginia
Multiracial affairs in the United States